Amarna letter EA 288, titled Benign Neglect, is a tall, finely-inscribed clay tablet letter, approximately 7.5 in tall x 4.5 in wide, broken into two pieces, from Abdi-Heba the mayor/ruler of Jerusalem, of the mid 14th century BC Amarna letters. The scribe of his six letters to Egypt were penned by the "Jerusalem scribe"; EA 288 is a moderately long, and involved letter.

The Amarna letters, about 300, numbered up to EA 382, are a mid 14th century BC, about 1350 BC and 20–25 years later, correspondence. The initial corpus of letters were found at Akhenaten's city Akhetaten, in the floor of the Bureau of Correspondence of Pharaoh; others were later found, adding to the body of letters.

Letter EA 288 (also see here-(Obverse)), is numbered VAT 1643, from the Vorderasiatisches Museum Berlin.

A summary of letter structure: EA 288 begins with a short address to the Pharaoh. Immediately, 3 segue paragraphs begin the letter, as "dramatic statements" by the Jerusalem scribe (and Abdi-Heba); a fourth segued statement follows. Then the purpose of the letter begins, covering the second half of the letter's obverse and the reverse.

Paragraphs I-VIII (IX), complete the letter's obverse (as seen in photo).

Cuneiform and Akkadian text, EA 288

Obverse

(Line 1)—[ A ]-na 1.lugal-ri-EN-ia {d}Utu-ia qi2-[ bi-ma ]–(To King-Lord-mine Sun-god, my .. Speaking )
(2)—um-ma 1.ARAD2-Hi-Ba ARAD2-ka-ma–.–.–.–(message Abdi-Heba Servant-yours)
(3)—a-na 2. giri3-meš lugal-EN-ia 7. ta-a-an–.–(at 2.(Both) Feet(s) King-Lord-mine --///-- 7. (times) )
(4)—ù 7. ta-a-an am-qut-mi–.–(..and 7. (times) --///-- I bow ! (?I address you?) )

Paragraph II
(5)—A-mur !.. lugal-ri-EN-ia ša-ka-an–.–( ! Look (here) ! .. King-Lord-mine --///-- (You) Emplaced )
(6)—szum3-szu a-na mu-s,i {d}Utu XX1–.–.–.–.–( Name-his At (the) "Setting" god Sun XX1 )
(7)—ù ir-bi {d}Utu XX2 ha-an-pa–.–( and (the) Rising(entering) godSun XX2 --///-- growing abundantly ! )
(8)—ša ih-nu-pu a-na mu-hi-ia–.–(.. which "grows abundantly" For Me ! (?Me & Us? )

Paragraph III
(9)—A-mur !.. a-na-ku --///-- la-a Lú-Ha-zi-a-nu–.–( ! Look (here) ! --//-- {"-I- --///-- Not"} (a) Mayor (Hazzanu) ! )
(10)—Lú-ú-a-ú --////--a-na lugal-ri-EN-ia–.–( (a) Soldier --////-- For King-Lord-mine ! )

Akkadian (with wikilinks)

Obverse

(Line 1)—Ana Šar-Ri-Beli-ia dUtu qabû
(2)—umma Abdi-HeBa ardu-su
(3)—Ana 2. giri3-meš Sarri-Beli-ia 7. (times)
(4)—u3 7. (ta-a-an)(times) maqātu !

Paragraph II
(5)—( ! Amāru ! .. Šar-Ri- Belu-ia --///-- (You) šakānu ..)
(6)—šumu-šu ana mušu {d}Utu XX1
(7)—ù erēbu {d}Utu XX2 --//-- hanābu !
(8)—ša hanābu muhhu-ia

Paragraph III
(9)—( ! Amāru ! .. anāku --///-- lā --///-- (a)Mayor (Hazzanu)
(10)—Lú-ú-a-ú --////-- ana Šar-Ri- Beli-ia !

Akkadian (from CDLI, Chicago Digital Library Initiative)

(Akkadian Text), Akkadischer Text 
Obverse, (Vorderseite):
1. [a-n]a mšarri(LUGAL)ri bêli(EN)-ia dša[mš]i(UTU)[-ia q]í[-bi-ma]
2. um-ma mabdi(ÁRAD)-ḫi-ba ardu(ÁRAD)-ka-ma
3. a-na 2(m) šêpē(GÌRImeš) šarri(LUGAL) bêl(EN)-ia 7(m)-ta-a-an
4. ù 7(m)-ta-a-an am-qut-mi
5. a-mur šarri(LUGAL)ri bêli(EN)-ia ša-ka-an
6. šùm-šu a-na mu-ṣi dšamši(UTU)ši
7. ù ir-bi dšamši(UTU)ši ḫa-an-pa
8. ša iḫ-nu-pu a-na mu-ḫi-ia
9. a-mur a-na-ku la-a lúḫa-zi-a-nu
10. lúú-e-ú <a-na-ku> a-na šarri(LUGAL)ri bêli(EN)-ia
11. a-mur a-na-ku lúruì šarri(LUGAL)ri
12. ù ú-bi-il bilat(GUN) šarri(LUGAL)ri a-na-ku
13. ia-a-nu-mi lúad-da-a-ni ia-a-nu-mi
14. munusum-mi-ia zu-ru-uḫ šarri(LUGAL)ri dannu(KAL.GA)
15. [š]a-ak-n[a-an-ni] i-na bît(É) lúad-da-[a-ni]
16. [...]
17. [k]a-ša-ad a-na mu-ḫi-ia qa-a [...]
18. na-ad-na-ti 1(u) lúardūti(ÁRADmeš)[ a-na q]a-[t]i-[šu]
19. mšu-ú-ta lúrabiṣ(MÁŠKIM) šarri(LUGAL)ri ka-š[a-ad]
20. [a]-na mu-ḫi-ia 2(u) 1(m) munusmârāti(DUMU.MUNUSmeš)
21. 1(géš) 2(u) lú.meša-ší-ri na-ad-na-ti
22. [a]-na qa-ti mšu-ú-ta qîšat(NÍG.BA) šarri(LUGAL) bêli(EN)-ia
23. li-im-li-ik-mi šarri(LUGAL)ri a-na mâti(KUR)-šu
24. ḫal-qà-at mât(KUR) šarri(LUGAL)ri gáb-ba-ša
25. ṣa-ba-ta-ni nu-kúr-tú a-na ia-a-ši
26. a-di mâtāti(KURḫi.a) še-e-riki a-di alu(IRI) gín-ti-ki-ir-mi-il
27. šal-mu a-na gáb-bi lú.mešḫa-zi-a-nu-ti
28. ù nu-kur-tú a-na ia-a-ši
29. ip-ša-ti e-nu-ma lúḫa-pí-ri
30. ù la-a a-mar 2(m) înā(IGImeš) šarri(LUGAL)
31. bêli(EN)-ia ki-i nu-kúr-tú
 Reverse, (Rückseite): 

32. a-na muḫḫi(UGU)ḫi-ia ša-ak-na-ti
33. e-nu-ma gešelippa(MÁ) i-na lìb-bi tâmti(A.AB.BA)
34. qât(ŠU) zu-ru-uḫ šarri(LUGAL) dannatu(KAL.GA)
35. ti-li-iq-qí kurna-aḫ-ri-maki
36. ù kurka-<pa-si>ki x ka-a-siki ù i-na-an-na
37. alāni(IRI.DIDLIḫi.a) šarri(LUGAL)ri
38. ti-le-qé-ú lú.mešḫa-pí-ru
39. ia-a-nu-mi 1(m)-en lúḫa-zi-a-nu
40. a-na šarri(LUGAL)ri bêli(EN)-ia ḫal-qu gáb-bu
41. a-mur mtu-ur-ba-zu gaz(GAZ) d[e4-k]a
42. i-na abul(KÁ.GAL) alu(IRI) sí-lu-úki qa-al šarru(LUGAL)ru
43. a-mur mzi-im-ri-da alu(IRI) la-ki-siki
44. ig-gi-ú-šu ardūtu(ÁRADmeš) ip-šu a-na lú.mešḫa-pí-ri
45. mia-ap-ti-iḫ-dadda(IŠKUR) gaz(GAZ) te-k[a]
46. [i-n]a abul(KÁ.GAL) alu(IRI) zi-lu-ú ka-al
47. [a-mi]-nim [l]a-a i-ša-al-šu[-nu šarru(LUGAL)ru]
48. [ù li]-is-kín šarru(LUGAL)[ru a-na mâti(KUR)-šu]
49. [ù l]i-din šarru(LUGAL)ru pa-ni-šu ù [lu-ṣi-m]i
50. [amêlūtu(LÚmeš] ṣâbē(ÉRINmeš) pi-ṭa-ti a-na mâti(KUR)-š[u]
51. [ù] šum-ma ia-a-nu-mi ṣâbē(ÉRINmeš) pi-ṭa-tu4
52. i-na šatti(MU) an-ni-ti ḫal-qa-at a-ba-da-at
53. gáb-bi mâtat(KURḫi.a) šarri(LUGAL)ri bêli(EN)-ia
54. la-a i-qa-bi-ú a-na pa-ni šarri(LUGAL) bêli(EN)-ia
55. e-nu-ma ḫal-qa-at mât(KUR) šarri(LUGAL) bêli(EN)-ia
56. ù ḫal-qu gáb-bi lú.mešḫa-zi-a-nu-ti
57. šum-ma ia-a-nu-mi ṣâbē(ÈRINmeš) pi-ṭa-tu4
58. i-na šatti(MU) an-ni-ti lu-ma-še-er
59. šarru(LUGAL)ru lúrabiṣa(MÁŠKIM) ù li-il-qé-a-ni
60. a-na ia-a-ši a-di aḫē(ŠEŠmeš) ù Ba.Bad(BA.ÚŠ)
61. ni-mu-tu4 it-ti šarru(LUGAL)ru bêli(EN)-nu
62. [a-na] lútúp-šar(DUB.SAR) šarri(LUGAL)ri bêli(EN)-ia
63. [um-ma] mabdi(ÁRAD)-ḫi-ba ardu(ÁRAD)-ma a-na 2(m) šêp[ē](GÌRImeš)
64. [am-q]ut-mi še-ri-ib a-wa-ta5meš
65. [b]a-na-ti a-na šarri(LUGAL)r[i]
66. [danniš(MA.GAL) lú]ardu(ÁRAD)-[ka ù l]úmâru(DUMU)-ka a-na-ku

Cuneiform score, Akkadian, English

Cuneiform score (per CDLI, Chicago Digital Library Initiative), and Akkadian, and English.

Paragraph-(lines 23-33)
Note: Segue-(transition), from Obverse,  + Obverse-bottom, to Reverse (lines 23-33)

(Sub-Section 1 of 4), (lines 23-26)
23. li-im-li-ik-mi lugal-ri a-na kur-šu
___ malāku (Šárru)Šarru-ri ana mātu-šu–!
___ Give-concern Kingri for Land-His–!
24. hal-qà-at kur lugal-ri gáb-ba-ša
___ halāqu mātu Šarruri, gabbu-ša,
___ Over-Taken land-("region") Kingri, All-His,
24.8.--------gáb-ba-ša
___------------gabbu-ša –
___------------All-His –
25. ṣa-ba-ta-ni nu-KÚR-tú a-na ia-a-ši
___ ṣabātu nukurtu ana Iāši–!
___ "captured-in" warfare, from Me–!
26. a-di kur-hi.a Še-e-riki a-di Gín-ti-Ki-ir-mi-il
___ adi mātu-(pl.)-(matāti) Šeriki, adi Gínti-k-ir-m-il–!
___ also(plus) lands(pl.) Šeri, plus GintiKirmil–!
(Sub-Section 2 of 4), (lines 27-28)
27. šal-mu a-na gáb-bi, lú.meš ha-zi-a-nu-ti
___ šalāmu ana gabbu, lú(amēlu)meš Hazannu–!,
___ Peace for all, Menpl. Hazannu-(Governors)–!,
28. ù nu-kur-tú a-na ia-a-ši
___ U nukurtu ana Iāši–!
___ But warfare for Me- (Governor of Jerusalem)–!
(Sub-Section 3 of 4), (lines 29-31.5)
29. ip-ša-ti e-nu-ma lúha-pí-ri
___ Epēšu enūma lúHapiru–!
___ (I am)-made now (as a) (("rebel"))-MANHabiru–!
30. ù la-a a-mar 2(m) înā(IGImeš) šarri(LUGAL)
___u lā amāru 2 īnupl. Šarru-(Phar.)-
___ and not ((able to)) see (2 eyes)pl. ("Face/Countenance") (of-the) King-
31. bêli(EN)-ia, ki-i nu-kúr-tú–!
___-bēlu-ia —
___-Lord-mine —
(Sub-Section 4 of 4), (lines 31.5-33)
31.5--------ki-i nu-kúr-tu
___------------ — kī nukurtu–! —
___------------ — "Because–of" warfare–! —

Reverse, (Rückseite):

(Sub-Section 4 of 4), (lines 31.5-33)
Sub-Paragraph—Exclamation-(lines 31.5-33)

31.5--------ki-i nu-kúr-tu
___------------ — kī nukurtu–! —
___------------ — "Because–of" warfare–! —
((Reverse side starts here))
32. a-na muḫḫi(UGU)ḫi-ia ša-ak-na-ti
___ ana muhhu-(ia) šakānu
___ for upon-ME, emplaced,
33. e-nū-ma gešelippa(MÁ) i-na lìb-bi tâmti(A.AB.BA)
___ Enūma gišMÁ(eleppu) ina libbu tâmtu(A.AB.BA)-(the sea)–!
___ Now (I am) ((wooden))SHIP in the HEART-(middle) (of a) STORM-! (middle of the sea–! )
End of Sub-Sections

End of segue-(transition), to Reverse (lines 23-31.5, 31.5-33)

Paragraph, (lines 34-40)

34. qât(ŠU) zu-ru-uḫ šarri(LUGAL) dannatu(KAL.GA
___qātu zuruh, Šarru kal-ga
___(the)-Hand strong, King-mighty
35. ti-li-iq-qí kurna-aḫ-ri-maki
___halāqu KUR naḫrimaki–!
___Over-Took land((region)) Nahrima-(i.e. Aram-Naharaim)–!
36. ù kurka-<pa-si>ki x ka-a-siki ù i-na-an-na
___u kur ka-((<pa))-si>ki x ka-a-siki, u eninna
___and land Kasi (( x Kasi )), and now
36.6--------ù i-na-an-na
___------------U eninna
___------------And now
37. alāni(IRI.DIDLIḫi.a) šarri(LUGAL)ri
___alāni(IRI.DIDLIḫi.a) Šarruri
___Citiesḫi.a (of the) King
38. ti-le-qé-ú lú.mešḫa-pí-ru
___halāqu lú-meš ḫapíru–!
___Over-Taken (by) menpl. Hapiru–!
39. ia-a-nu-mi 1(m)-en lúha#-zi-a-nu
___ia-a-nu-mi 1(m)-EN(bēlu), — lú(amēlu)Hazannu
___"there-is-NOT" One (1) Lord, — ManHazannu (Governor),..
40. a-na šarri(LUGAL)ri bêli(EN)-ia, — hal-qu gáb-bu–!
___ana Šarru-ri EN-ia —,
___for King-Lord-mine —,
40.6 ------------- ḫal-qu gáb-bu
40.6--------------- halāqu gabbu–!
40.6--------------- (Over)-Taken All–!

Paragraph-(l. 41-47)

41. a-mur 1=dištu-ur-ba-zu gaz(GAZ#) d[e4-k]a-(dâku)
___amāru–! — 1=dišTurbazu gaz(GAZ#) d[e4-k]a-(dâku)
___Look (here)–! — Turbazu "killed"-!
42. i-na abul(KÁ.GAL) alu(IRI#) sí-lu-úki qa-al šarru(LUGAL)ru
___ina abullu ālu Siluki ga-al šarru(LUGAL)ru
___in city-gate city Siluki, "tragedy"?, Kingru (Phar.)
43. a-mur 1=m(male)=dišzi-im-ri-da alu(IRI) la#-ki#-siki
___amāru–! — 1=m(male)=dišZimredda ālu(IRI) Lachishki
___Look (here)–! — mZimredda city Lachish
44. ig-gi-ú-šu ardūtu(ÁRADmeš) ip-šu a-na lú#.mešḫa#-pí#-ri#
___ig-gi-ú-šu ardu-meš, epēšu ana lú#.meš-hapiru
___"killed-by" servants-(pl.), "committed" to men(amēlu)-pl.-(Hapiru("done by  men-Hapiru"))
45. mia-ap-ti-iḫ-dadda(IŠKUR) gaz(GAZ) te-k[a# ]
___m=1=dišYaptih-Hadda gaz(GAZ) te-k[a# ]
___m=1=dišYaptih-Hadda slain
46. [ i-n]a abul(KÁ.GAL) alu(IRI) zi-lu-ú ka-al
___ina abullu ālu Siluki ka-al
___in city-gate city Siluki ?killed,
47. [a-mi]-nim [l]a-a i-ša-al-šu[-nu šarru(LUGAL)ru ]

Paragraph-(l. ?47-53)

47. [a-mi]-nim [l]a-a i-ša-al-šu[-nu šarru(LUGAL)ru ]
48. [ù li]-is-kín šarru(LUGAL)[ru a-na mâti(KUR)-šu]
49. [ù l]i-din šarru(LUGAL)ru pa-ni-šu ù [lu-ṣi-m]i
50. [amêlūtu(LÚmeš] ṣâbē(ÉRINmeš) pí-ta-ti a-na mâti(KUR)-š[u
___ _LÚmeš-(amēlu)pl. pítati, — ana māti(KUR)
___men-(pl.) army-(pl.) pítati, — for land-his
51. [ù] šum#-ma ia-a-nu-mi ṣâbē(ÈRINmeš) pi-ṭa-tu4
___u šumma ia-a-nu-mi ṣābu-meš pi-ṭa-tu4
___and if "there is not" army-(pl.)-pítati -- (lines 57 & 51 are identical)
52. i-na šatti(MU) an-ni-ti ḫal-qa-at  a-ba-da-at
___ina šattu (MU) annû, — ḫalāqu a-ba-da-at(abātu-"destroyed"?)
___in year this, — Over-Taken, (destroyed?)
53. : (–gl–) gáb-bi _mâtat(KURHI.A)_ _šarri(SÀR-ri_ _bêli(EN)_-ia
___ : (–gl–) gabbu mātuHI.A, – SÀR-ru, bēlu-ia, —!
___all landspl., – King, Lord-mine, —!

Paragraph-(l. 54-61)

54. la-a i-qa-bi-ú a-na pa-ni šarri(_LUGAL_) bêli(_EN_)-ia
___lā qabû pānu, — King Bēlu-mine
___(( (This-is)-"Not spoken before", — King Lord-mine))
55. e-nu-ma ḫal-qa-at mât(_KUR_) _šarri(ŠÀRru_) bêli(_EN_)-ia
___enūma ḫalāqu mātu(KUR), – Šarri(LUGAL) bēlu(EN)-ia–! —
___Now Over-Taken land("region"), – King-Lord-mine–! —
56. ù hal-qu gáb-bi lú.mešha-zi-a-nu-ti
___u ḫalāqu gabbu, – lú(amēlu)-meš-Hazannu–!,
___and over-taken all, – men-(pl.)-Hazannu–!
57. šum-ma ia-a-nu-mi ṣâbē(ÈRINmeš) pi-ṭa-tu4
___šumma ia-a-nu-mi ṣābu-meš pi-ṭa-tu4,
___If "there is not" army-(pl.)-pítati, -- (lines 57 & 51 are identical)
58. i-na šatti(MU) an-ni-ti lu-ma-še-er
___ina šattu (MU) annû, — lu-ma-še-er
___in year this, — lu-ma-še-er (?lūman)-"Now, alas!"?)
59. šarru(LUGAL)ru lúrabiṣa(MÁŠKIM) ù li-il-qé-a-ni
60. a-na ia-a-ši a-di aḫē(ŠEŠmeš) ù Ba.Bad(BA.ÚŠ)
61. ni-mu-tu4 it-ti šarru(LUGAL)ru bêli(EN)-nu

Paragraph, lines 62-66
Note: Final address to the "King-Lord-mine" (Pharaoh, and Pharaoh's scribe)

62. [ a-na ] _lú#dup-sar(DUB.SAR)_ _lugal-ri_ _EN_-ia
___Ana lú#țupšarru-(=țuppu-šarru, Tablet-King, i.e. "Scribe"), ((u)) Šarru-ri bēlu-ia
___To man-"scribe-(King)", ((and)) "King-Lord-mine"
63. [ um-ma ] mabdi(ÁRAD)-ḫi-ba ardu(ÁRAD)-ma a-na 2(m) šêp[ē](GÌRImeš#)
___umma 1(=diš)-ÁRAD-hi-ba, ardu ana 2 _šepupl._#
___[ message(=Report?)] 1-Abdi-Heba, servant at the 2-feetpl.
64. [ am-q]ut#-mi, še-ri-ib, a-wa-ta5meš#
___maqātu, șēru, ((my))-"Story", (word(pl.)) (=amatupl.)#)
___I bow, (on-my-back) (="defenselessly"), ((my))-story (wordspl.))
65. [ b]a#-na-ti a-na šarri_(LUGAL)r[i]_
___[b]anû A, & banû B   ana (Šárru)Šarru-[ ri ]
___((produced))-"created, and 'to-be-good' ", for King-[ ri ]

Line 66, on Left side
66. [ danniš(MA.GAL) _lú] ardu(ÁRAD)_-[ ka ù ] _lúmâru(DUMU)_-ka a-na-ku
___[ magal (= danniš), (anāku)-lú ]ardu-[ ka–!, u]  (anāku)-lú]dūmu-ka anāku((as verb, "I am"))–!
___Fervently(strongly), (I am) servant-yours–!, and (I am) son-(="Compatriot")-yours ( I(=anāku) = "I am", (as verb) )–!

See also
Abdi-Heba
Amarna letters–phrases and quotations
List of Amarna letters by size
Amarna letter EA 5, EA 9, EA 15, EA 19, EA 26, EA 27, EA 35, EA 38 
EA 153, EA 161, EA 288, EA 364, EA 365, EA 367

References

Moran, William L. The Amarna Letters. Johns Hopkins University Press, 1987, 1992. (softcover)
Parpola, 1971. The Standard Babylonian Epic of Gilgamesh, Parpola, Simo, Neo-Assyrian Text Corpus Project, c 1997, Tablet I thru Tablet XII, Index of Names, Sign List, and Glossary-(pp. 119–145), 165 pages.
Rainey, 1970. El Amarna Tablets, 359-379, Anson F. Rainey, (AOAT 8, Alter Orient Altes Testament 8)

Ext links

 Line drawing of EA 288, CDLI
CDLI entry of EA 288 ( Chicago Digital Library Initiative )
CDLI listing of all EA Amarna letters, 1-382
VAT, Vorderasiatische Museum (Berlin) entry for EA 288; Views of Obverse, Reverse, & sides (7 photos) 

Amarna letters
Ancient history of Jerusalem
Canaan